Abdullapur Union is a union of Tongibari Upazila of Munshiganj District, Bangladesh.

Location
North: Mirkadim Pourasava
East:  Rampal
South: Sonarong
West:  Betka

Population
At the 1991 Bangladesh census, Abdullapur Union had a population of 4461.

References

Unions of Tongibari Upazila